In theosophy and anthroposophy, the Akashic records are a compendium of all human events, thoughts, words, emotions, and intent ever to have occurred in the past, present, or future. 

Akashic records may also refer to:

Akashic Records, a short-lived music label by musician Craig Smith
Akashic Re:cords, a 2016 mobile role-playing video game
Akashic Records of Bastard Magic Instructor, a 2014 light novel with manga and anime adaptations
Akasic Record, a 2001 album by Kalahari Surfers
The Akashic Record, a 2012 album by Radioinactive

See also
Akasha (disambiguation)